Dudleya pulverulenta is a species of perennial succulent plant known by the common names chalk lettuce, chalk dudleya, and chalk liveforever. It is one of the largest Dudleya, with a silvery, waxy rosette that may greatly contrast with its habitat.

Description
Dudleya pulverulenta is a rosette-forming, succulent species of plant, covered in a distinctive chalky and mealy wax, known as a farina, or more technically, epicuticular wax. It is one of the largest species of Dudleya. The long, red flowers hang downward, an adaptation to hummingbird pollinators. After flowering, the fruits are turned erect by a sharp turn of the branchlet, known as a pedicel, connecting the flower to the inflorescence. This unique syndrome is only shared by Dudleya anthonyi, a close relative, and Dudleya rigida, an extremely rare species found in far southern Baja California Sur. Dudleya arizonica is similar in appearance, and approaches D. pulverulenta in many aspects, but lacks the downward-pointing flowers and unique fruiting behavior, instead having erect flowers and a more reduced size.

Morphology 
As the plant grows older, the stem gradually becomes decumbent. The stem is densely clothed with old, dried leaves. Atop this stem is a solitary rosette, as the stems do not form axillary branches. The leaves are shaped oblong, broadest at the base or upper third, with the tip acuminate to mucronate, or acute. The epidermis of the plant is covered with a dense coating of chalky, powdery epicuticular wax.

The bracts are spreading to deflexed, and are shaped cordate-ovate to suborbiculate, with an acuminate tip. The peduncle branches into 2 to 6 branches, which may or may not rebranch. The cincinni are circinate, unfurling like the frond of a fern. The cincinni hold 10 to 30 flowers, and are twisted at the base, so that the flowers are on the underside.

In age, the pedicels sharply bend in the near middle to bring the fruits to a more or less erect position. The apex of the petals is shaped acute to obtuse, with the tips erect. The sepals are waxy, while the petals are red, with some wax.

Dudleya pulverulenta flowers in early summer, usually from May to July. Plants subject to full sun close their rosettes during the summer, and in July to August the leaves will begin to fold upward and inward, "shrinking" in the heightened temperatures. Plants on north-facing or shaded slopes are less likely to close their rosettes.

Phytochemistry 
Higher temperatures are tolerated well by Dudleya because of their epicuticular wax, which reflects light and prevents evaporation of water droplets.

Taxonomy 
The type specimen was collected by Thomas Nutall in San Diego, in May 1835. Dudleya puvlerulenta hybridizes with Dudleya lanceolata where they overlap in their ranges.

Characteristics 
Dudleya pulverulenta intergrades with both Dudleya anthonyi and Dudleya arizonica, and the boundaries between these three entities are not always clearly defined. Dudleya brittonii bears a superficial resemblance to this species, but differs significantly in its smaller yellowish-white flowers and dense inflorescence. Two charts (below) compares the characteristics of these four species.

Distribution and habitat

Dudleya pulverulenta is native to California and Baja California. Its range extends from extreme southern Monterey County southward to Punta Prieta in the central desert of Baja California. It is typically found in rocky cliffs, and canyons, generally under 1000 meters in elevation. It is primarily a plant of coastal distribution and can often be found within 12 miles of the coast, and more inland occurrences are typically in valleys where the heat is moderated by elevation or coastal influence.

Plants are very rapid recolonizers as evidenced by proliferation on roadcuts or disturbed soil shortly after development. Their habitat preference for rocky, shallow soils and open habitats mean that fuel is limited in proximity to the plants, enabling them to survive wildfire. The plant will resprout after fire.

Cultivation 
The plant tolerates full sun exposure or part shade. It is susceptible to aphid infestations which result in flower and rosette deformities. It is a much hardier plant for the garden environment than the more commonly available Dudleya brittonii.

Dudleya pulverulenta is not noted for its longevity and may only live up to 2 or 3 years in cultivation, but some specimens in the wild may be over 40 years old in a most optimal location. When the plant dies, the rosette takes on a withered, ashy gray appearance, resembling a bird's nest. It is important to note whether the center leaves of the rosette are still alive, as the dormant plant will often surround a few live leaves with a ring of withered leaves until the next growing season pushes them down.

See also 

 Dudleya anthonyi
 Dudleya arizonica
 Dudleya brittonii

References

External links

Jepson Manual Treatment of Dudleya pulverulenta
USDA Plants Profile for Dudleya pulverulenta
U.C. Photos gallery − Dudleya pulverulenta

pulverulenta
Flora of California
Flora of Baja California
Natural history of the California chaparral and woodlands
Natural history of the Peninsular Ranges
Natural history of the Santa Monica Mountains
Natural history of the Transverse Ranges
Garden plants of North America
Drought-tolerant plants
Taxa named by Thomas Nuttall
Taxa named by Joseph Nelson Rose
Taxa named by Nathaniel Lord Britton